Mildred Newman was an American psychologist and author known for her self-help books.

Early life 
Newman's mother was from Russia, and Newman grew up in Manhattan. Newman gained an undergraduate degree (1940) and a master's degree (1943) from Hunter College. Prior to working as a psychologist, Newman spent time studying modern dance and was an artists' model. She trained as a psychoanalyst at the National Psychological Association for Psychoanalysis, which was founded by Theodor Reik.

Career 
Newman started her psychoanalyst practice in New York City in the middle of the 1950s. She realized that her patients needed a place to have positive feedback, and in 1971 she and her husband Bernard Berkowitz started a book that became How to Be Your Own Best Friend. In 2018, an article in the New York Post attributed the self-help industry that followed back to this 1971 book.

Newman worked with many clients, starting with Paula Prentiss,Anthony Perkins, George Segal, Neil Simon, Nora Ephron, and others. She and her husband treated so many celebrities that they were known as "therapists of the stars". She and her husband also participated in social events with her clients.

Newman was a proponent of conversion therapy, famously treating Perkins with electroshock to supposedly "cure" his homosexuality; for this, Perkins' friend and collaborator Stephen Sondheim described her to author Mark Harris as "completely unethical and a danger to humanity."

Personal life 
Her first husband was Philip Newman, though they later divorced. She met her second husband, Bernard Berkowitz as a teenager waiting in line for a concert, and they married in 1962. By 1978 they were sharing recipes in a newspaper article that was one of a series on celebrity recipes. Newman died of a pulmonary embolism on November 6, 2001, aged 81.

Selected publications

References

2001 deaths
American writers
Self-help writers
American women psychologists
Hunter College alumni
1920s births